The Internationaler Saarlandpokal was a football competition organised by 1. FC Saarbrücken, after the club were denied in their application to regularly compete in France's Ligue 2. The competition is regarded as a forerunner to the European Cup.

Background
Saarland had initially become independent following the fall of Napoleon, before being incorporated in Germany in January 1871, following the Unification of Germany. Founded in 1903, 1. FC Saarbrücken finished runners up in the 1943 German football championship, losing 3–0 in the final against Dresdner SC. After German defeat in World War II, the region was administered by the French Fourth Republic as the Saar Protectorate. The Saarland national football team was soon formed, playing their first game on 22 November 1950, beating Switzerland 4–2 in Saarbrücken.

Following the creation of the Saar Protectorate, FC Saarbrücken competed in the 1948–49 French Division 2, winning the championship under the Francised name of FC Sarrebruck, beating Valenciennes 9–0 and Rouen 10–1 on the way to the title. Saarbrücken applied to join the French Football Federation at the insistence of FIFA president Jules Rimet. Saarbrücken's application was resoundly rejected by French clubs, particularly those in Alsace and Lorraine who had been forced to play in the German Gauliga Elsaß following the German occupation of France from 1940 to 1944. Saarbrücken's results were consequently discounted and RC Lens won the championship. 

With the Saar's Ehrenliga deemed too weak for a club of Saarbrücken's stature, the club organised the Internationaler Saarlandpokal between 15 European clubs with a prize fund of two million Saar francs being awarded to the winners of the tournament.

1949–50 edition
The tournament began on 18 September 1949 with FC Saarbrücken defeating Swiss club FC La Chaux-de-Fonds 7–0. Saarbrücken played every game at their  home, with the three clubs with the best results against Saarbrücken joining the hosts in the semi-finals.

Qualifying round

Semi-finals

Third place play-off

Final

1950–51 edition
The following season, the tournament was hosted by both FC Saarbrücken and fellow Saarlanders Borussia Neunkirchen at their Ellenfeldstadion ground with games played on a home and away basis. For the 1950–51 edition, German clubs were invited for the first time, as well as five new entries from Europe. The tournament was never completed due to a lack of interest and sponsorship after it was agreed that Saarlander clubs would return to the German football system in time for the 1951–52 Oberliga.

List of teams

Legacy
The Internationaler Saarlandpokal gave FC Saarbrücken new found exposure and the club played Switzerland, Liverpool, Universidad Católica, Real Madrid, Athletic Bilbao and Newell's Old Boys in the months following the formation of the competition. The competition is regarded as a forerunner to the European Cup, with Saarbrücken representing the Saar in the 1955–56 European Cup, despite playing in the German league system at the time. Saarbrücken won their first game in UEFA's inaugural European competition, beating A.C. Milan 4–3 at the San Siro, before losing the second leg and exiting the competition on aggregate.

References

1. FC Saarbrücken
German football friendly trophies
Defunct international club association football competitions in Europe
Recurring sporting events established in 1949
Recurring sporting events disestablished in 1951
1949 establishments in Europe
1951 disestablishments in Europe
Football competitions in Saarland
Borussia Neunkirchen